"Million Miles" is the third single from Reamonns fifth studio album Reamonn. It was released on 13 February 2009 in Germany by Universal Music from the label Island Records. The song is a rock ballad.

Music video
In the video the band Reamonn plays in a wood of a snowy mountain range. A woman (Romanian model Madalina Draghici) runs through this forest and is looking for the band. She finds them at the end of the video.

Track listing
 German CD single: [CD1] (black artwork):
 "Million Miles" (Radio Edit) – 3:47
 "Stay" – 3:36

 Germany: [CD2] (gray artwork)
 "Million Miles" (Radio Edit) - 3:47
 "Million Miles" (Piano Version) - 4:00

Charts

References

External links 
  Million Miles at Reamonn.com

2009 singles
Reamonn songs
Songs written by Kara DioGuardi
Songs written by Emanuel Kiriakou
Rock ballads
2008 songs
Universal Music Group singles
Island Records singles
Songs written by Rea Garvey